Oliver Fernandez (Orizaba, 7 December 1972) is a former professional tennis player from Mexico. He was captain of Mexico's Davis Cup side. Today he is a businessman.

Career
Fernandez had a good year on the juniors circuit in 1990, finishing the season as the number three junior in the world. He was runner-up to Andrei Medvedev in the Orange Bowl and made the semi-finals of the boys' singles event at the 1990 Australian Open. The man who beat him in the semi-final, Dirk Dier, had been his doubles partner when he made the 1989 US Open boys' doubles quarter-finals.

Also in 1990, Fernandez represented the Mexico Davis Cup team for the first time. He managed to defeat Marcelo Filippini of Uruguay in Mexico's World Group player-off win and appeared in three further ties during his career, from which he had two wins, over Diego Pérez and then Jaime Yzaga.

The Orizaba born player was a semi-finalist at his home event, the Mexican Open, in 1993. Fernandez defeated Franco Davín, Agustín Moreno and Alberto Berasategui, before falling to Thomas Muster. He was also a doubles semi-finalist at the 1993 International Tennis Championships in Florida, with Juan Garat as his partner.

Challenger titles

Singles: (1)

Doubles: (2)

References

1972 births
Living people
Mexican male tennis players
People from Orizaba
Sportspeople from Veracruz
Pan American Games medalists in tennis
Pan American Games silver medalists for Mexico
Tennis players at the 1991 Pan American Games
Central American and Caribbean Games gold medalists for Mexico
Central American and Caribbean Games silver medalists for Mexico
Central American and Caribbean Games bronze medalists for Mexico
Central American and Caribbean Games medalists in tennis
20th-century Mexican people